Common Technical Regulation (CTR). In telecommunications, CTR refers to a rule governing the connection of terminal equipment to networks. CTRs are drawn up, under the provisions of the EU directive 98/13/EC by the Telecommunications research and action center (TRAC) and European Telecommunications Standards Institute (ETSI), at the request of ACTE, which is chaired by the European Commission. These rules apply to all EU member states.

See also
Communication source
COLUMBUS II (cable system)
CALM M5

Telephony
European Union and science and technology